The Papua New Guinea Hunters (PNG Hunters) are a professional rugby league football club based in Papua New Guinea. They were formed in December 2013 and compete in the  Hostplus Cup, a second tier competition in Australia. The Hunters are the second Papua New Guinean side to enter the Queensland Cup following the Port Moresby Vipers who competed for two seasons in 1996 and 1997. Every Hunters match is shown live on national free-to-air television. The Hunters' home ground is the National Football Stadium in Port Moresby and their team colours are red, black and gold. The Hunters won the Hostplus Cup in 2017.

Papua New Guinea NRL Bid
The Australian Labor Party have pledged their support behind the PNG Hunters entering the National Rugby League competition. Papua New Guinea have introduced a National Schools Rugby League Championships which started in 2019 to prepare its junior rugby league talent from the six year olds to the Under 18 divisions for the future. The PNG Government, Australian Government, PNGRFL and QRL signed an agreement which will see the Australian Government assisting to develop the sport in the country. Titled 'Growing and Supporting Rugby League in Papua New Guinea', it is an Australian Government initiative to develop pathways for PNG teams like the Hunters Under 19s and Hunters Women's to play in high-level Australian sporting competitions with a focus on female athlete development, wellbeing and education, and commercial sustainability under the three year program. The PNG Government have officially launched the Papua New Guinea NRL Bid to participate in the Australian NRL Competition as the 18th team. Andrew Hill , former Canterbury Bulldogs and RLWC 2017 CEO will lead the PNG 2025 NRL Bid.

Strategic pathways partnership with Dolphins (NRL) 

The PNG Hunters have announced a strategic partnership with Dolphins (NRL)  that will see four Hunters players joining the Redcliffe Dolphins (NRL) side during NRL pre-seasons.

Stadiums

Kalabond Oval 

The Kalabond Oval which is in the town of Kokopo and has a capacity of 7,000 was the Hunters first home ground. The first ever home match in the Intrust Super Cup was against the defending champions Mackay Cutters on 8 March 2014 which the Hunters won 24-16. The ground was used for the club's first 2 seasons.

National Football Stadium 

The National Football Stadium is in the capital city Port Moresby and after undergoing a major refurbishment it was announced in February 2016 that the Hunters would move to the ground for the 2016 season, after they'd played one match there during the 2015 season against Souths Logan Magpies on 13 June 2015 winning 34-12.

2023 squad

Notable players

Justin Olam
Edwin Ipape

See also

 Rugby league in Papua New Guinea

References

External links

 
Rugby clubs established in 2013
2013 establishments in Papua New Guinea
2021 establishments in Australia
Expansion of the National Rugby League
Papua New Guinean rugby league teams
Diaspora sports clubs in Australia
Proposed sports teams
Proposals in Australia